Florin Corbeanu (born 17 March 1976 in Bucharest) is a Romanian rower.

References 
 
 

1976 births
Living people
Romanian male rowers
Sportspeople from Bucharest
Olympic rowers of Romania
Rowers at the 2000 Summer Olympics
Rowers at the 2004 Summer Olympics
World Rowing Championships medalists for Romania